This is a '''list of Utah State Aggies football players in the NFL Draft.

Key

Selections

References

Utah State

Utah State Aggies NFL Draft